Kavaklıdere is a village in Bornova district of İzmir Province, Turkey. The population of Kavaklıdere  is 2801  as of 2011. Most of Kavaklıdere residents work in city services in İzmir and elsewhere.

References

Villages in İzmir Province
Bornova District